Millicent Simmonds (born March 6, 2003) is a deaf American actress who starred in the 2018 horror film A Quiet Place and its 2020 sequel A Quiet Place Part II. Her breakout role was in the 2017 drama film Wonderstruck. For Wonderstruck and A Quiet Place, she was nominated for several awards for best youth performance. In television, she appeared in Andi Mack in 2018 and in This Close in 2019.

Background 

Simmonds grew up in Bountiful, Utah in the United States. She has four siblings; two older and two younger than her. Prior to turning 12 months old, Simmonds lost her hearing due to a medication overdose. Her mother learned American Sign Language and taught the family so they could communicate with her. Simmonds said without her family using ASL, "I wouldn't have a relationship with my own family, I wouldn't have communication." Simmonds also has a cochlear implant.

Simmonds's mother also encouraged her to read books extensively. When Simmonds was three years old, she started attending the Jean Massieu School of the Deaf, where she participated in its drama club. Her first play was in A Midsummer Night's Dream as Puck. After completing sixth grade, she mainstreamed at the Mueller Park Junior High School in the fall of 2015. She has performed at the Utah Shakespeare Festival in Cedar City, Utah, and her primary film experience before Wonderstruck was a deaf student's short, "Color the World".

Acting career

Wonderstruck and A Quiet Place

Simmonds was 12 years old when she was cast for the film Wonderstruck, which was then released in 2017. She had read the deaf-themed juvenile novel Wonderstruck when it was published in 2011. When open casting for the film began, her former drama teacher shared the news with her, and she auditioned for a role in the film. She competed with over 250 others. When she won the role, she moved to New York City with her mother and her younger siblings to film Wonderstruck. She used American Sign Language interpreters to communicate on set and also received a tutor to continue schoolwork while filming. Vanity Fairs Charles Bramesco said of her casting, "A Utah native without any major film credits to her name, young Simmonds is expected to make quite a splash both as a new face in the industry as well as an icon for deaf and otherwise sensory-disabled actors." When Wonderstruck premiered at the 2017 Cannes Film Festival, the Associated Press's Jake Coyle said Simmonds's screen debut was "hailed as a breakthrough". Simmonds was subsequently nominated for several awards for best youth performance (see accolades). The Associated Press also recognized Simmonds as one of eight actors who were Breakthrough Entertainers of 2017.

In 2018, Simmonds starred in the horror film A Quiet Place as the deaf daughter of a hearing couple, played by John Krasinski and Emily Blunt. While the producers did not specifically plan to cast a deaf actress to play the deaf daughter, Krasinski, who was also the director, pushed to have a deaf actress. Simmonds and her family answered Krasinski's questions for writing a screenplay about a family with a deaf child. The filmmakers hired an ASL interpreter for Simmonds, so that signed and spoken language could be interpreted fluently on set. Simmonds helped teach her fellow actors to sign.

TV roles and return to A Quiet Place 

In 2018, Simmonds appeared in a two-episode arc in the third season of the Disney Channel television series Andi Mack. She had first appeared as an extra in the first season, and the series creators invited her back for a recurring role. For her arc, Simmonds taught the other actors how to use ASL, and the showrunners decided to show her scenes involving ASL without providing subtitles so viewers could focus on figuring out the sign language. In one of the episodes, Simmonds also spoke for the first time ever on-camera, responding audibly "I like you" in response to Asher Angel's character Jonah signing "I like you" to her character. Simmonds said of the spoken dialogue, "I can't even remember how it was brought up or who had the idea, but I remember my mom asking me how I felt about it, and I told her I thought I could try. I was actually pretty nervous about it. I don't use my voice a lot in public."

In the following year, Simmonds appeared in an episode of the second season of This Close. In October, Simmonds was cast in a lead role in the pilot for the TV series Close Up on Freeform, and production took place later in the year in Vancouver. By May 2020, Freeform passed on the pilot.

Simmonds also reprised her role in the sequel film A Quiet Place Part II, which filmed in the middle of 2019. John Krasinski, who also directed the sequel, said, "I had this small idea, which was to make Millie [Simmonds] the lead of the movie... her character opens the door to all the themes I was dealing with in the first movie." The film had its world premiere in March 2020, but due to the COVID-19 pandemic, its commercial release was postponed to May 2021.

Future projects: 2021–onward 

In July 2021, Simmonds partnered with Circle of Confusion Television Studios to star in and executive produce a TV adaptation of the 2022 deaf-themed book True Biz by Sara Nović. In the following October, Simmonds was cast as the deafblind historical figure Helen Keller for the film Helen & Teacher with principal photography scheduled to start in mid-2022.

Simmonds will be part of the Broadway adaptation of Levi Holloway's play Grey House, which will premiere on May 30, 2023.

Deaf advocacy 

Following Simmonds's 2017 debut in Wonderstruck, a Utah-based news outlet reported, "Millie plans to continue both acting and advocating for the deaf community." In 2019, after starring in A Quiet Place, Simmonds received the Greenwich International Film Festival's Make An Impact Award and participated in the festival's panel to discuss cinematic representation of people with disabilities.

In 2020, with the commercial release of A Quiet Place Part II being postponed to the following year due to the COVID-19 pandemic, Simmonds and a speech-language pathology clinical fellow designed a face mask that includes a transparent panel to allow lip-reading and facial expressions to be seen. Simmonds partnered with fair-trade fashion brand Rafi Nova to make the masks and to have net proceeds go to deaf and hard-of-hearing organizations. She also participated in a virtual panel hosted by the Academy of Motion Picture Arts and Sciences about representation of creative figures with disabilities, as part of the 30th anniversary of the Americans with Disabilities Act of 1990. Toward the end of the year, the teenage magazine Seventeen recognized Simmonds among 15 recipients of Voices of the Year 2020 for their vision and activism.

With deaf characters historically played by hearing actors, or sign language obscured by the editing process, Simmonds considers her films Wonderstruck, A Quiet Place, and A Quiet Place Part II as "a corrective" to that history.

Credits

Accolades

References

Further reading 

 (Juvenile audience)

External links 

2003 births
21st-century American actresses
Actresses from Utah
American child actresses
American deaf actresses
American film actresses
Living people
People from Bountiful, Utah